Waneta Ethel (Nixon) Hoyt (May 13, 1946 – August 13, 1998) was an American serial killer who was convicted of killing all five of her biological children.

Early life
Hoyt was born in Richford, New York. She dropped out of Newark Valley High School in the 10th grade to marry Tim Hoyt on January 11, 1964.

Deaths of children 
James Hoyt, Hoyt's longest surviving biological child, died on September 26, 1968, 28 months after he was born on May 31, 1966. All of Hoyt's other biological children died before turning six months old: Eric (October 17, 1964 – January 26, 1965), Julie (July 19 – September 5, 1968), Molly (March 18 – June 5, 1970), and Noah (May 9 – July 28, 1971). For more than 20 years, it was believed that the babies had died of sudden infant death syndrome.

Several years after the death of their last child, the Hoyts adopted a child, Jay, who remained healthy through childhood and was 17 when his adopted mother was arrested in 1994.

The last two biological Hoyt children, Molly and Noah, were subjects of pediatric research conducted by Dr. Alfred Steinschneider, who published an article in 1972 in the journal Pediatrics proposing a connection between sleep apnea and SIDS. The article was later discredited, and subsequent research failed to replicate the results.

Investigation and trial
In 1985, a prosecutor in a neighboring county who had been dealing with a murder case initially thought to involve SIDS, was told by one of his experts, Dr. Linda Norton, a forensic pathologist from Dallas, Texas, that there may be a serial killer in his area of New York. Norton arrived at this suspicion after reviewing Steinschneider's report on the Hoyt case in which the Hoyts were not identified by name. When the prosecutor became the district attorney in 1992, he tracked the case down and sent it to a forensic pathologist, Michael Baden, for review. Baden concluded that the deaths were the result of murder.

In 1994, because of jurisdictional issues, the case was transferred to the district attorney of the county in which the Hoyts resided.

In March 1994, Hoyt was approached at the post office by a New York State trooper with whom she was acquainted. He asked her for help in research he was doing on SIDS, and she agreed. She was then questioned by the trooper and two other policemen. At the end of the interrogation, she confessed to the murders of all five children by suffocation, and she was arrested. The reason that she gave for the murders was that the babies were crying and she wanted to silence them.

Hoyt later recanted her confession, and its validity was an important issue during the trial. An expert hired by the defense, Dr. Charles Patrick Ewing, testified, "It is my conclusion that her statement to the police on that day was not made knowingly, and it was not made voluntarily." He diagnosed Hoyt with dependent and avoidant personality disorders, and he opined that she was particularly vulnerable to the tactics used during her interrogation.

Dr. David Barry, a psychiatrist hired by the prosecution agreed that Hoyt had been manipulated by the police tactics. Nevertheless, Hoyt was convicted in April 1995.

On September 11, 1995, she was sentenced to 75 years to life, 15 years for each murder, to be served consecutively. It has been speculated since her conviction that Hoyt suffered from Münchausen syndrome by proxy, a diagnosis that is not universally accepted in the psychiatric community.

Aftermath
Hoyt died in prison of pancreatic cancer in August 1998. She was formally exonerated under New York law because she died before her appeal. She was buried at Highland Cemetery in Richford, New York.

See also
 List of serial killers in the United States

References

1946 births
1998 deaths
20th-century American criminals
20th-century American women
American female murderers
American female serial killers
American murderers of children
American people convicted of murder
American people who died in prison custody
Deaths from pancreatic cancer
Filicides in New York (state)
People convicted of murder by New York (state)
People from Richford, New York
People with avoidant personality disorder
Prisoners who died in New York (state) detention
Serial killers who died in prison custody